Scampston is a village and civil parish in the Ryedale district of North Yorkshire, England. Until 1974, the village lay in the historic county boundaries of the East Riding of Yorkshire. The village is part of the Rillington ward an electoral area covered by Ryedale District Council and is currently represented by Cllr Nathan Garbutt Moore.

The village has a bakery and coffee shop.

Scampston Hall is also located in the village. Scampston's Lodge Park is one of the finest holiday lodge parks in the North of England. Set within the beautiful parkland of Scampston Hall.

Scampston whose name was variously written in ancient documents, Scamestun, Skameston, Skameston, and Skampston, and which was probably derived from a personal name.

Scampston was the birthplace of William Latimer, 4th Baron Latimer, the first member of the British Parliament to be impeached, in 1376.

References

External links

Villages in North Yorkshire
Civil parishes in North Yorkshire